The Aalenian is a subdivision of the Middle Jurassic Epoch/Series of the geologic timescale that extends from about 174.1 Ma to about 170.3 Ma (million years ago). It was preceded by the Toarcian and succeeded by the Bajocian.

Stratigraphic definitions
The Aalenian takes its name from the town of Aalen, some 70 km east of  Stuttgart in Germany. The town lies at the northeastern end of the Swabian Jura. The name Aalenian was introduced in scientific literature by Swiss geologist Karl Mayer-Eymar in 1864.

The base of the Aalenian is defined as the place in the stratigraphic column where the ammonite genus Leioceras first appears. The global reference profile (GSSP) is located 500 meters north of the village of Fuentelsaz in the Spanish province of Guadalajara. The top of the Aalenian (the base of the Bajocian) is at the first appearance of ammonite genus Hyperlioceras.

In the Tethys domain, the Aalenian contains four ammonite biozones:
zone of Graphoceras concavum
zone of Brasilia bradfordensis
zone of Ludwigia murchisonae
zone of Leioceras opalinum

References

Notes

Literature
; 2004: A Geologic Time Scale 2004, Cambridge University Press.
; 2001: The Global Boundary Stratotype Section and Point (GSSP) of the Toarcian-Aalenian Boundary (Lower-Middle Jurassic), Episodes 24(3): pp 166–175.
; 1864: Tableau synchronistique des terrains jurassiques. 1 Tabelle, Zürich. 
; 2002: A compendium of fossil marine animal genera (entry on cephalopoda), Bulletins of American Paleontology 364, p 560.

External links
GeoWhen Database - Aalenian
Lower Jurassic timescale, at the website of the subcommission for stratigraphic information of the ICS
Stratigraphic chart of the Upper and Lower Jurassic, at the website of Norges Network of offshore records of geology and stratigraphy

 
01
Geological ages